Wait Wait... Don't Tell Me! is an hour-long weekly news radio panel show produced by WBEZ and National Public Radio (NPR) in Chicago, Illinois. On the program, panelists and contestants are quizzed in humorous ways about that week's news. It is distributed by NPR in the United States, internationally on NPR Worldwide and on the Internet via podcast, and typically broadcast on weekends by member stations. The show averages about six million weekly listeners on air and via podcast.

Format

Wait Wait... Don't Tell Me! was usually recorded in front of a live audience in Chicago at the Chase Auditorium beneath the Chase Tower on Thursday nights. They also do tours around the country performing in front of a live audience. Due to the COVID-19 pandemic, in the spring of 2020 they converted to recording remotely, largely from their homes, and had sound effects and a virtual audience added for broadcast. Beginning in August 2021, they have held in-person recordings, when possible, with a live audience. Starting with the June 11, 2022 episode, the show returned to having a live audience every week in the Studebaker Theater.

The show is hosted by playwright and actor Peter Sagal. When the program had its debut in January 1998, Dan Coffey of Ask Dr. Science was the original host, but a revamping of the show led to his replacement in May of that year. The show has also been guest-hosted by Tom Bodett, Luke Burbank, Adam Felber, Peter Grosz, Tom Papa, Mike Pesca, Richard Sher, Bill Radke, Susan Stamberg, Robert Siegel, Brian Unger, Drew Carey, Tom Hanks, Helen Hong, Jessi Klein, Maz Jobrani, Negin Farsad, Alzo Slade, Josh Gondelman and Karen Chee.

Wait Wait... listeners also participate by telephoning or sending emails to nominate themselves as contestants. The producers select several listeners for each show and call them to appear on the program, playing various games featuring questions based on the week's news. Prior to October 21, 2017, the usual prize for winning any game was to have Kasell (named "Scorekeeper Emeritus" following his retirement) record a greeting on the contestant's home answering machine or voice mail system; after Kasell's death in 2018, the prize was changed to have a host or panelist of the contestant's choice record a greeting.

Panelists
In addition to the regular panelists listed below, the show also occasionally features one-off guest panelists.

Regular 

 Cristela Alonzo
 Brian Babylon
 Roy Blount Jr.
 Alonzo Bodden
 Tom Bodett
 Joel Kim Booster
 Luke Burbank
 Adam Burke
 Amy Dickinson
 Negin Farsad
 Adam Felber
 Bobcat Goldthwait
 Josh Gondelman
 Peter Grosz
 Maeve Higgins
 Helen Hong
 Maz Jobrani
 Jessi Klein
 Hari Kondabolu
 Laci Mosley
 Tom Papa
 Paula Poundstone
 Greg Proops
 Roxanne Roberts
 Mo Rocca
 Faith Salie
 Alzo Slade
 Dulcé Sloan

Past panelists 

 Sue Ellicott (1998–2007)
 Aamer Haleem (2005–06)
 Margo Kaufman (1998–1999)
 Angela Nissel (2006–2007)
 Patt Morrison (2000–2001)
 Kyrie O'Connor (2004–2015)
 P.J. O'Rourke  (2001-2020)
 Charlie Pierce (1998–2015)
 Paul Provenza (2006–2010)
 Richard Roeper (2004–2006)
 Peter Sagal (1998)
 Alison Stewart (2008–2009)
 Julia Sweeney (2009–2010)

On-air segments

Though there are some deviations from time to time, episodes of Wait Wait... Don't Tell Me! feature the following format:

Opening tease
As with other NPR programs, Wait Wait offers a one-minute top-of-hour billboard teasing the program that will follow the network's hourly newscast (which traditionally starts at 1 minute past the hour). In this minute, the host offers a humorous comment on the week's news, mentions the identity of the week's interview guest, and sets up an out-of-context reading by Kurtis of a quote or game title from the episode.

Who's Bill This Time?
The contestant is asked to identify the speaker or explain the context of three quotations from that week's major news stories as read by Bill Kurtis. Each answer is followed by a humorous discussion of the story by the host and the panelists. Two correct answers constitute a win for the contestant. Prior to Kasell's retirement, the segment was known as "Who's Carl This Time?" and he read the quotations.

Panel questions
In two separate segments each week, the host asks the panelists questions regarding less serious stories in the week's news, awarding them one point for each correct answer.  The questions are phrased similarly to those featured on The Match Game or Hollywood Squares to allow the panelists to offer a comedic answer in addition to their real guess as well as a hint from the host if needed. The answer is often followed by a discussion of the story.

Bluff the Listener
Each panelist reads an unusual story, all sharing a common theme. Only one of the three stories is genuine; the contestant wins the prize by choosing it. A sound bite from a person connected to the genuine story is played to reveal whether the contestant's guess is correct. Regardless of the outcome, the panelist whose story is chosen scores one point.

Not My Job

A celebrity guest calls in (or occasionally appears on stage) to be interviewed by the host and the panelists as well as take a three-question multiple-choice quiz. In Wait Waits early years, "Not My Job" guests were mainly pulled from NPR's roster of personalities and reporters; the pool of guests later expanded to include guests of greater celebrity. As the segment's title suggests, the guests are quizzed on topics that are not normally associated with their field of work.  For example, former U.S. Secretary of State Madeleine Albright was asked questions on the history of Hugh Hefner and Playboy magazine, while author Salman Rushdie was asked about the history of Pez candy. Often, the subject matter of the quizzes serve as an oblique yet comic juxtaposition to the guests' fields of work, such as when Mad Men creator/producer Matthew Weiner was quizzed on ways people try to cheer others up ("Glad Men") in a March 2015 appearance.

Listener Limerick Challenge
Kurtis reads three limericks connected to unusual news stories, leaving out the last word or phrase of each. The contestant wins the prize by correctly completing any two of them. The limericks are written by Philipp Goedicke.

Lightning Fill-in-the-Blank 
In the Lightning Fill-in-the-Blank each panelist has to answer as many questions as they can in 60 seconds.

Television
In 2008, National Public Radio reached an agreement with CBS Entertainment to create a television pilot of Wait Wait... Don't Tell Me! Peter Sagal and Carl Kasell would be in the pilot, and Doug Berman would be the executive producer.

On November 16, 2011, BBC America announced that the show would make its television debut with a "2011 Year in Review" special airing on December 23, to be retransmitted by NPR stations on the 24th and 25th. The taping included two American panelists—Wait Wait regulars Paula Poundstone and Alonzo Bodden—and British newcomer Nick Hancock. In December 2018, NBCUniversal announced it was developing a television version of Wait Wait… Don't Tell Me!

Live cinema
On May 2, 2013, an episode was performed at the NYU Skirball Center for the Performing Arts in New York City and was streamed live via satellite as a Fathom Events presentation to hundreds of cinema theaters throughout the United States and Canada.  The show included host Peter Sagal, announcer Carl Kasell, and panelists Mo Rocca, Paula Poundstone, and Tom Bodett. Celebrity guest Steve Martin won in the Not My Job segment.

Awards

In April 2008, Wait Wait won a Peabody Award. The program website was nominated for a Webby Award for Humor in 2008.

References

External links
 
 
 Wait Wait...Don't Tell Me!'s BBC America site
 Show Details and Statistics
 "Wait, Wait... It's Peter Sagal and Doug Berman"—October 28, 2019 Commonwealth Club of California interview and discussion of the show and its origins

 
1998 radio programme debuts
1990s American comedy game shows
1990s American radio programs
2000s American comedy game shows
2000s American radio programs
2010s American comedy game shows
2010s American radio programs
2020s American comedy game shows
2020s American radio programs
American radio game shows
American satire
Peabody Award-winning radio programs
Chicago radio shows
radio programs adapted into television shows
satirical radio programmes